Betalghat is a small town and tehsil in Nainital district, Uttarakhand, India. As of 2011, it had a total population of 21265 spread over 4357 households.

Most people of the village speak Kumaoni language and Hindi.

There is a riverside area in Betalghat along the Kosi River, a post office, and a marketplace.  The nearest railway station is at Ramnagar (65 km) and Kathgodam (87 km).koatdhiriya (6 Km). 

A new organisation has Came in Betalghat with Name Betaleshwar Seva Simiti and work for people who are poor it is run by Mr Rahul Arora who is the Chair Person of Dhinai dairy (Goshala in which many people get employment). He opened a Vikash Bhawan in which all the services are free for poor people and Girls and women who want to get knowledge in any field like computer or machine learning it provides them free of cost.

Education

Betalghat is small town so for further study students have to go Haldwani, Nainital or Ramnagar.

Shahid Khem Chandra Collage (B.A)
Inter College Betalghat.
Girls Inter College Betalghat.
Sarswati Vidhya Mandir. 
Aashram Padhti.

As per the report a new paramedical collage is about to open in Betalghat and hiring for that has oppned.

Tourism

As it is a Pahari town so this is best Place for people who want to spend time in nature and with this People enjoy fishing in Kosi river 

Famous temple

Nakuwa Bubu Mandir.

Durgapur Dham 

Amel Devi temple

Pali Village 

Source of income

Most of the people are farmers.

Transport
The Betalghat bridge, which connects Betalghat with Garampani, was made in 1990. Betalghat Taxi stand is at the corner side of this bridge.
There is a bridge on the Kosi River with a length of about 200 meters which connects Betalghat and Malli Seti, and further down this road connected with Ramnagar.
Well shuttled bus and taxi services are available for Ramnagar, Haldwani, Nainital, Ranikhet, Almora, Bhatrojkhan and Garampani-Khairna.
No roadways connected
Only private bus and sumo running
Evening 5 PM NO BUS NO SUMO 

Apart From This Many Private cab service providers are in The Market in Which Cab Booking Online is famous and providers services in Whole Uttarakhand, this is specially for tourists.

Railway Station

Ramnagar is the nearest railway station and after Ramnagar you have to hire cab or in the morning you will get K.M.O.U bus at 7 o clock.

By Flight

Pantnagar is the nearrest domestic airport and this is around 112 km away from Betalghat and from Pantnagar you have to hire private cab or Pantnagar to Haldwani and than you will get bus or local taxi to Betalghat.

References

Cities and towns in Nainital district
Tehsils of India